St. Helenaville Archaeological Site is a historic archeological site located on Saint Helena Island near Frogmore, Beaufort County, South Carolina. St. Helenaville was a small antebellum village and summer retreat located on the northeastern end of St. Helena Island. St. Helenaville was damaged by several major storms, which ultimately caused part of the village to fall into the sound. There is very little historical documentation of the village. Several remains of tabby and brick are evident.

It was listed in the National Register of Historic Places in 1988.

References

Archaeological sites on the National Register of Historic Places in South Carolina
Buildings and structures in Beaufort County, South Carolina
National Register of Historic Places in Beaufort County, South Carolina